Martin Cohen (born 3 February 1952) is a South African former professional association footballer who played for the Los Angeles Aztecs.

Playing career 
Cohen was born in Johannesburg, South Africa, and is Jewish.  He was a starter for Highlands Park during the apartheid era of soccer in South Africa. He had trained with this club since the age of 10. On 20 April 1974, Cohen was part of the White XI that played their black counterparts in a racially charged match at Rand Stadium. After initially going down 1-0 to the black side (the goal was called off-side by referee Wally Turner), Cohen scored a crucial goal before Neil Roberts put the game away.

In 1975, Cohen won the South Africa's player of the year.

In December 1976 he signed with the Los Angeles Aztecs. He scored his first two goals in the first leg of the second round of the NASL playoffs against the Dallas Tornado as the Aztecs won 3-1. He played with the California Surf in 1979.

His son, Larry Cohen, is also a footballer.

See also
List of select Jewish football (association; soccer) players

Footnotes

External links
 NASL Profile

Living people
South African Jews
Jewish footballers
South African soccer players
Highlands Park F.C. players
South African expatriate soccer players
Los Angeles Aztecs players
North American Soccer League (1968–1984) players
Expatriate soccer players in the United States
South African expatriate sportspeople in the United States
California Surf players
Soccer players from Johannesburg
1952 births
Bidvest Wits F.C. players
Association football midfielders
Jewish South African sportspeople